Griffith Film School (GFS) is a media production baccalaureate college located in Brisbane, Australia. Bachelor's degrees range from film and television production, animation and games design. It is housed in the heritage-listed former South Brisbane Library.

Bachelor Programs 
 Bachelor of Film and Screen Media Production 
 Bachelor of Animation
 Bachelor of Games Design

Post-Graduate Program 
 Graduate Certificate in Screen Production
 Graduate Diploma of Screen Production
 Master of Screen Production
The Master of Screen Production has been designed in close co-operation with leading industry professionals to enable focus on:
 Direction
 Scriptwriting
Specialisations include: Cinematography, Sound Design, Post-production, Visual Effects, Screen Music, Production Design, Documentary and Animation.

LiveLab 
LiveLab is the commercial production arm of Griffith Film School.

Notable alumni
Angie Fielder, producer
Peter Hegedus, award-winning documentary writer, director and producer
Lachlan Pendragon, Oscar-nominated for his student film An Ostrich Told Me the World Is Fake and I Think I Believe It
Peter Spierig, Australian film director, producer, and writer
Michael Spierig, Australian film director, producer, and writer
Sankalp Reddy Director (The Ghazi Attack)

Artist in Residence 
The Griffith Film School invites and hosts a number of Artist in Residency to consult and mentor the students in an Intensive mode.  These Artists include, but are not limited to:
 Lord David Puttnam
 Mark Travis
 Myrna Gawryn
 Kim Farrant
 Peter James

External engagement

Centre International de Liaison des Ecoles de Cinéma et de Télévision – CILECT 
The Griffith Film School became the 3rd Australian Full Member of Centre International de Liaison des Ecoles de Cinéma et de Télévision (CILECT) in 2005.  The other Australian Full Members are AFTRS, VCA and Swinburne.  In November 2016, the Griffith Film School will host the next CILECT Congress with the theme "Ethics: Aesthetics".

Australian Screen Production, Education and Research Association - ASPERA 
The Griffith Film School was one of the inaugural founders of the Australian Screen Production, Education and Research Association - ASPERA .

Asia Pacific Screen Lab 
In association with NETPAC and the Asia Pacific Screen Academy, the Griffith Film School organises the year-long immersive development program, the Asia Pacific Screen Lab.

See also
Griffith University

References

External links
Griffith Film School

Film schools in Australia
Griffith University